This is a list of broadcast television stations that are licensed in the U.S. state of North Dakota.

Full-power stations
VC refers to the station's PSIP virtual channel. RF refers to the station's physical RF channel.

Defunct full-power stations
Channel 10: KNOX-TV - ABC/NBC - Grand Forks (12/11/1955-2/?/1964)
Channel 12: KCND-TV - ABC/NBC - Pembina/Winnipeg, Manitoba (11/7/1960-8/31/1975)
Channel 27: KCPM - UPN/MyNetworkTV - Grand Forks (2003-12/15/2014)

Low-power stations

Translator stations

Sources
TV stations Channel 2-69 in North Dakota FCC

North Dakota
 
Television stations